Sadni Hrib (earlier Zgornji Vecenbah, Zgornji Vencenbah, or Gornji Vecenbah) is a village in the Municipality of Kočevje in southern Slovenia. The area is part of the traditional region of Lower Carniola and is now included in the Southeast Slovenia Statistical Region. It no longer has any permanent residents.

History
Sadni Hrib was a Gottschee German village. Before the Second World War it had 13 houses. The village was not destroyed during the war. Only three houses remained in the village in 1953, and the last inhabitants left in 1958.

References

External links
Sadni Hrib on Geopedia
Pre–World War II map of Sadni Hrib with oeconyms and family names

Former populated places in the Municipality of Kočevje